Janet Chow (born 25 August 1983, in Hong Kong) is a Hong Kong actress. She has ancestry in Shanghai.  She was the 2nd runner-up in the 2006 Miss Hong Kong competition.  She attended Markville Secondary School in Markham, Ontario and University of Toronto.

Personal life
She immigrated to Canada at age 7. 
She married actor Timmy Hung in 2012 with a grand wedding. and had her first child, a boy, in 2013. Her father-in-law Sammo Hung is also an actor and a martial artist.

Pageant career
Both Chow, and Miss Hong Kong 2006 winner Aimee Chan Yan Mei, had competed at Miss Chinese Toronto 2004, although each failed to place. Chow was the only contestant of the pageant born in Hong Kong. Later, Chow joined the top 16 of the Miss Hong Kong 2006 pageant as one of four women who were selected from overseas (Toronto)  to compete. During the finals, she won the Miss Photogenic award, and received the highest swimsuit score (44) during her catwalk, although her interview only merited 34 points.  She eventually placed as first runner-up.

She represented Hong Kong at the Miss World 2006 pageant due to the winner of Miss Hong Kong, Aimee Chan, being overage.

Television career
Chow has appeared as an actress for A Fistful of Stances, Fly with Me, Some Day, Growing Through Life, Every Move You Make, Forensic Heroes III, and Let it Be Love for Television Broadcasts Limited Hong Kong.

Awards
Miss Hong Kong 2006 First Runner-Up
Miss Hong Kong 2006 Miss Photogenic

References

External links
 Official TVB Blog

1983 births
Living people
Actresses from Toronto
Hong Kong emigrants to Canada
Hong Kong television actresses
Miss World 2006 delegates
Naturalized citizens of Canada
People from Markham, Ontario
TVB actors
21st-century Hong Kong actresses
21st-century Canadian actresses